The large painted locust (Schistocerca melanocera) is endemic to the Galapagos Islands of Ecuador, except Española Island. The locusts form a large part of the diet of the Galápagos hawk and lava lizards. Can be up to 8 cm long.

References

External links

Locusts
Endemic fauna of the Galápagos Islands
Insects of South America
Insects described in 1861